Kutchubaea is a genus of plant in the family Rubiaceae. It contains the following species (but this list may be incomplete):
 Kutchubaea insignis
 Kutchubaea neblinensis
 Kutchubaea montana Steyerm.

References 

 
Rubiaceae genera
Taxonomy articles created by Polbot